Moominland Midwinter (Swedish title Trollvinter) is the sixth in the series of Tove Jansson's Moomins books, published in 1957. This book sees Jansson adopt a darker, more introspective tone compared to the earlier books that is continued in the remainder of the series. Often in the book Moomintroll is either lonely, miserable, angry or scared - the result of being forced to survive in a world to which he feels he does not belong. While preserving the charm of the previous novels, the story involves a more in-depth exploration of Moomintroll's character than before.

Plot summary

While the rest of the Moomin family are in the deep slumber of their winter hibernation, Moomintroll finds himself awake and unable to get back to sleep.

He discovers a world hitherto unknown to him, where the sun does not rise and the ground is covered with cold, white, wet powder.

Moomintroll is lonely at first but soon meets Too-ticky, a wise spirit who sings mysterious songs, and his old friend Little My (who takes delight in sledging down the snowy hills on Moominmamma's silver tea tray).

The friends build a snow horse for the Lady Of The Cold and mourn the passing of an absent-minded squirrel who gazed into the Lady's eyes and froze to death. However, a squirrel is spotted alive by Moomintroll at the end of the book, and it seems that it may have come back to life.

As the haunting winter progresses, many characters (notably the Groke, Sorry-oo the small dog, and a boisterous skiing Hemulen) come to Moominvalley in search of warmth, shelter and Moominmamma's stores of jam.

Adaptations
Moominland Midwinter was adapted into episodes 23-33 of the 1977 stop motion series which was compiled into the 2017 feature film Moomins and the Winter Wonderland, as well as episodes 22, 23 and 37 in the 1990 TV series. 

The book was adapted by BBC Radio 4, as part of their Christmas Day 2021 Schedule, starring John Finnemore as Moomintroll

References

External links

The Moomin Trove

1957 children's books
1957 fantasy novels
20th-century Finnish novels
Moomin books
Swedish-language novels
1957 Finnish novels

ja:ムーミン#小説作品